Pedicularia decurvata is a species of sea snail, a marine gastropod mollusk in the family Ovulidae, one of the families of cowry allies.

Description

Distribution
This bathyal marine species occurs off the Azores.

References

 Lorenz F. & Fehse D. (2009) The living Ovulidae. A manual of the families of allied cowries: Ovulidae, Pediculariidae and Eocypraeidae. Hackenheim: Conchbooks.

External links
 Locard, A. (1897-1898). Expéditions scientifiques du Travailleur et du Talisman pendant les années 1880, 1881, 1882 et 1883. Mollusques testacés. Paris, Masson. vol. 1 

Pediculariinae
Gastropods described in 1897